Karl Friedrich Küstner (born in Görlitz on 22 August 1856, died 15 October 1936) was a German astronomer who also made contributions to Geodesy. In 1888 he reportedly discovered the Polar motion of the Earth. In 1910 he received the Gold Medal of the Royal Astronomical Society for cataloguing stars and detecting latitude variation.

He received his PhD from the University of Strasbourg in 1879 under Friedrich August Theodor Winnecke.

References 

1856 births
1936 deaths
19th-century German astronomers
Recipients of the Gold Medal of the Royal Astronomical Society
Foreign associates of the National Academy of Sciences
German geodesists
University of Strasbourg alumni
20th-century German astronomers